This is the results breakdown of the local elections held in Asturias on 22 May 2011. The following tables show detailed results in the autonomous community's most populous municipalities, sorted alphabetically.

Overall

City control
The following table lists party control in the most populous municipalities, including provincial capitals (shown in bold). Gains for a party are displayed with the cell's background shaded in that party's colour.

Municipalities

Avilés
Population: 84,202

Gijón
Population: 277,198

Langreo
Population: 45,397

Mieres
Population: 43,688

Oviedo
Population: 225,155

San Martín del Rey Aurelio
Population: 18,549

Siero
Population: 51,730

See also
2011 Asturian regional election

References

Asturias
2011